Penry v. Lynaugh, 492 U.S. 302 (1989), was a United States Supreme Court case that sanctioned the death penalty for mentally disabled offenders because the Court determined executing the mentally disabled was not "cruel and unusual punishment" under the Eighth Amendment. However, because Texas law did not allow the jury to give adequate consideration as a mitigating factor to Johnny Paul Penry's intellectual disability at the sentencing phase of his murder trial, the Court remanded the case for further proceedings. Eventually, Penry was retried for capital murder, again sentenced to death, and again the Supreme Court ruled, in Penry v. Johnson, that the jury was not able to adequately consider Penry's intellectual disability as a mitigating factor at the sentencing phase of the trial. Ultimately, Penry was spared the death penalty because of the Supreme Court's ruling in Atkins v. Virginia, which, while not directly  overruling the holding in "Penry I", did give considerable negative treatment to Penry on the basis that the Eighth Amendment allowed execution of mentally disabled people.

Opinion of the Court
The Court ruled that the execution of the mentally retarded does not violate the Eighth Amendment's ban on cruel and unusual punishments.

Concurring and dissenting opinions

See also
 List of United States Supreme Court cases, volume 492
 List of United States Supreme Court cases
 Lists of United States Supreme Court cases by volume
 List of United States Supreme Court cases by the Rehnquist Court

References

Further reading

External links
 
 

Capital punishment in Texas
Cruel and Unusual Punishment Clause and death penalty case law
Overruled United States Supreme Court decisions
United States Supreme Court cases
United States Supreme Court cases of the Rehnquist Court
1989 in United States case law